Danielle Murphy (born 4 June 1981) is an English former footballer who played as a defender or midfielder for Millwall Lionesses, Charlton Athletic, Watford and Barnet. She won 23 caps for England at senior international level.

Club career
Murphy joined Millwall Lionesses as a 14-year-old after a chance meeting with Pauline Cope. She made her Premier League debut at 14 and won the 1997 FA Women's Cup, playing alongside fellow 15-year-old Katie Chapman. In 1999 Murphy went to the University of Florida on a soccer scholarship. During her four years in the United States, she played for the Florida Gators women's soccer team in National Collegiate Athletic Association (NCAA) competition and was named to the 2001 All-American team. While playing for Florida she was a teammate of Abby Wambach.

When Murphy returned to England in July 2003, she signed for Charlton Athletic Ladies. In four successful years Charlton won the 2005 FA Women's Cup and the Premier League Cup in 2004 and 2006. Murphy was then an outspoken critic of relegated Charlton Athletic's decision to axe the women's team in 2007.

Murphy was one of seven players to join Watford Ladies from Charlton in August 2007. She moved to Barnet Ladies in February 2008.

International career
Murphy was the captain of England U-18s when she made her senior debut, aged 16, in a match against Scotland. She was England's youngest ever player since the Football Association took over the team in 1993.

She won 23 caps and was named in the Euro 2001 squad. After participating in 2003 FIFA Women's World Cup qualification, Murphy retired from international football to concentrate on her studies in America.

Personal life

Murphy attended Beaverwood School for Girls and graduated with a degree in sociology from the University of Florida. She works as a Firefighter and ran the London Marathon in 2006. She now plays hockey for Abingdon hockey club.

Honours
FA Women's Cup: 2
1996–97, 2004–05
FA Women's Premier League Cup: 4
1996–97, 2003–04, 2005–06, 2010–11

See also
List of Florida Gators soccer players
List of University of Florida alumni

References

External links
Barnet Profile

1981 births
Living people
Charlton Athletic W.F.C. players
England women's international footballers
English women's footballers
Expatriate women's soccer players in the United States
FA Women's National League players
Florida Gators women's soccer players
Millwall Lionesses L.F.C. players
People from Sevenoaks
Watford F.C. Women players
Barnet F.C. Ladies players
Women's association football midfielders
British firefighters
English expatriate sportspeople in the United States
English expatriate women's footballers